The Antares is a glider built by Lange Aviation produced with three different wingspans, 18, 20 and 23 meters.  The 20 and 23 meter variants can be equipped with a 42-kW electric motor and SAFT VL 41M lithium-ion batteries.

The EM 42 is a fixed-shaft brushless DC electric motor (see Lange EA 42) running at 190-288 V, and drawing up to 160 A, the 42 kW motor can deliver up to 216 N.m of torque over a speed range of 160-1600 RPM with a total efficiency of 90%. Maximum continuous power is 38.5 kW, the motor weighs 29 kg, and the weight of power electronics is 10 kg. The motor turns a two-blade fixed-pitch propeller, LF-P42, constructed of composite materials, having a diameter of two meters.

The battery system consists of two battery packs positioned in the leading edges of both inner wings (72 cells divided into 24 modules containing 3 cells each). The battery life is expected to be 3000 cycles or 20 years. The capacity of the battery is 41 Ah (specific energy 136 Wh/kg and specific peak power 794 W/kg). The batteries can deliver 13 minutes at maximum power and maximum climb speed, and can climb 3,000 meters on one battery charge; in reality, in warm climates, motor and electronics temperature limitations can limit the achievable climb height. The charger is integrated inside the fuselage so when landing elsewhere the pilot merely has to find a (16A) electric outlet socket. The glider has a modem connected to its main computer so that Lange technicians can, in theory, run diagnostics remotely. The same modem allows the pilot remote control & monitoring of the battery charging process.

The undercarriage and engine doors are electro-hydraulically operated. The tailwheel is steerable. The wing has an elliptical planform, with winglets and wing-tip wheels. The glide polar shows excellent high speed performance.

Variants

 Antares 18S - 18 meter wingspan pure glider.
 Antares 18T - 18 meter wingspan glider with Solo 2350 two-stroke gasoline sustainer engine.
 Antares 20E - 20 meter wingspan with 42 kW electric self-launch capable engine.
 Antares 23E - 23 meter wingspan with 42 kW electric self-launch capable engine.

Specifications

Antares 20E

Antares 23E

See also

References

Lange Aviation website
Specification of Antares 20E
Specification of Antares 23E
SAFT VL41M Data sheet
E1 Antares Type-certificate data sheet 
Lange EA 42 engine Type-certificate data sheet
LF-P42 propeller Type-certificate data sheet

Antares
2000s German sailplanes
Single-engined pusher aircraft
Motor gliders
Mid-wing aircraft
Electric aircraft
Mid-engined aircraft
T-tail aircraft
Aircraft first flown in 2003